The Mississippi House of Representatives is the lower house of the Mississippi Legislature, the lawmaking body of the U.S. state of Mississippi. According to the state constitution of 1890, it is to comprise no more than 122 members elected for four-year terms. To qualify as a member of the House candidates must be at least 21 years old, a resident of Mississippi for at least four years, and a resident in the district for at least two years. Elections are held the first Tuesday after the first Monday in November.

Membership, qualifications, and apportionment
Article 4, Section 36 of the Mississippi Constitution specifies that the state legislature must meet for 125 days every four years and 90 days in other years. The Mississippi House of Representatives has the authority to determine rules of its own proceedings, punish its members for disorderly behavior, and expel a member with a two-thirds vote of its membership. Bills must undergo three readings in each house, unless two-thirds of the house dispenses with the rules. They cannot be amended to a new purpose. Amendments to bills must be approved by both houses.

The governor has the power to veto legislation, but legislators can override the veto with a two-thirds decision. From 1890 to 2020, State representatives were authorized under the Mississippi Constitution to elect the Governor of Mississippi if no candidate had received 62 of the 122 electoral votes (one per district) and more than 50% of the popular vote. This occurred only once, in 1999, when Ronnie Musgrove had the most votes statewide, but was one electoral vote and 2936 votes (0.38%) shy of a majority: Musgrove was elected on the first ballot.

List of members

Salary and benefits
State representatives earn $23,500 per year.

List of speakers 
The House has elected a speaker 61 times since 1817:

Latest election results and current party standings
The following composition reflects the balance of power after the 2019 elections, which was the third election since Reconstruction to give a majority of seats in the State House to the Republicans. State representatives are elected every four years by the qualified electors of the district for which they are running. Candidates are required to be at least 21 years of age and a resident of the state and district for which they are campaigning.

Past composition of the House of Representatives

See also
Mississippi State Senate
Mississippi State Capitol
Mississippi Legislature

References

External links

Hou
Hou
State lower houses in the United States